Majda's model is a qualitative model (in mathematical physics) introduced by Andrew Majda in 1981 for the study of interactions in the combustion theory of shock waves and explosive chemical reactions.

The following definitions are with respect to a Cartesian coordinate system with 2 variables. For functions ,  of one spatial variable  representing the Lagrangian specification of the fluid flow field and the time variable , functions ,  of one variable , and positive constants , the Majda model is a pair of coupled partial differential equations:

the unknown function  is a lumped variable, a scalar variable formed from a complicated nonlinear average of various aspects of density, velocity, and temperature in the exploding gas;
the unknown function  is the mass fraction in a simple one-step chemical reaction scheme;
the given flux function  is a nonlinear convex function;
the given ignition function  is the starter for the chemical reaction scheme;
 is the constant reaction rate;
 is the constant heat release;
 is the constant diffusivity.

References

Combustion
Explosions